Mehdi Hmili, is a Tunisian filmmaker. He is best known as the director of critically acclaimed shorts and feature films Thala My Love, The Night of Badr and Li-La.

Personal life
He was born and raised in Tunis, Tunisia. After graduating with a degree in direction and screenplay from the Manouba University in Tunis, he moved to France for further studies.

Career
During France life, he graduated from the Paris Film School. After graduation, he directed his maiden short film X-Moment in 2009 and then Li-La in 2011. This black and white drama revolves around the difficulty of loving. After the critic success, he directed his second short The Night Of Badr, another black and white drama about an old homosexual poet. The film was screened in March 2012.

In 2014, he worked as the cinematographer of the documentary short Offside. Then in 2016, he made his debut feature film Thala Mon Amour. The film focused in the village of Thala during the Tunisian Revolution. The film was later released at the end of 2014 in France and Tunisia. Apart from filmmaking, he is also a popular poet in Tunisia where he made poems against the regime of Ben Ali. He also made two 16mm films, Instant Guilty and The Graduate.

Filmography

References

External links
 

Living people
Tunisian film directors
Tunisian male film actors
Year of birth missing (living people)